Pia-Sophie Oldhafer (born 1 July 1992) is a German field hockey player. She represented her country at the 2016 Summer Olympics.

References

External links
 

1992 births
Living people
Sportspeople from Hanover
German female field hockey players
Field hockey players at the 2016 Summer Olympics
Olympic field hockey players of Germany
Place of birth missing (living people)
Olympic bronze medalists for Germany
Olympic medalists in field hockey
Medalists at the 2016 Summer Olympics
21st-century German women